The following list introduces the characters of the Magical Girl Lyrical Nanoha in Main and Movie Timeline.

Protagonists

Nanoha Series

 
 
 The main protagonist of the series, Nanoha is an ordinary nine year old girl that answered a call of help from an injured ferret.

 
 
 A mysterious blonde haired magical girl, that Nanoha encounters in her search for the Jewel Seeds, referred to by Nanoha as having "sad, lonely eyes". In the series, she surprises her by being another magical girl just like Nanoha. Her surname is derived from the Ferrari Testarossa.

 
 
 Hayate is a wheelchair-bound orphan, who in the series is under the care of the Wolkenritter (German for Cloud-knights), though they kept their battles from her. She is aware that the completion of the Book of Darkness will grant her vast power, but does not want to obtain it at the expense of the lives of others.

Vivid Series
 
 
 A main protagonist of Magical Girl Lyrical Nanoha ViVid. In Striker S, she was found with a relic and rescued by Caro and Erio. She and Nanoha became fond of each other. Later in the series Nanoha has taken her in and Fate helps take care of her. Named after the Subaru Vivio.

 
 
 A user of Kaiser Arts that had given herself the name of the previous Sankt Kaiser, . She picked street fights in order to prove that Hegemon's strength is the greatest of all Belkan warriors. Like Vivio, she has heterochromia and possesses both a child form and an adult form. Her surname is derived from the Lancia Stratos.

 
 
 A main protagonist of ViVid Strike!. A childhood best friend of Rinne from the orphanage where the two of them grew up together. After she is apprenticed by Einhart, she becomes more calm and relaxed but still wants to get stronger so she can fight alongside Rinne. Nevertheless, Fuka is gracious towards her fighting skilled seniors despite some of them being a few years younger than her. Her surname is derived from the Lamborghini Reventon.

 
 
 A student at Bulgheroni Academy. She was adopted by the Berlinetta family after she was orphaned for unknown reasons; Rinne and her friend Fuka stayed at the same orphanage during their childhood, which is also the place where they spent the first years of their lives at.

Force Series
 
 
 A male protagonist of Magical Record Lyrical Nanoha Force. A freelance archaeologist from the planet Vaizen, who travels various places with his camera device, Steed. His surname is derived from the Nissan Avenir.

 
 
 A female protagonist of Magical Record Lyrical Nanoha Force. A mysterious girl discovered by Thoma in a facility on the world of Ruwella.

Magical Girl Lyrical Nanoha

Supporting characters
 
 
 Yūno is a magic-user from Midchilda and is the same age as Nanoha. Despite of his young age, he worked as an archaeologist and discovered a set of ancient and powerful artifacts (the magical term for this is Lost Logia) known as the Jewel Seeds.

 
 
 Arf is a character a familiar of Fate Testarossa, whom she strives to protect. (Her name has also been romanized as Aruf.)

Time-Space Administration Bureau
 
  (season 1 and A's), Tomokazu Sugita (six years later of A's and StrikerS), Lauren Landa (season 1 and A's, English)
 Chrono is a commissioned officer of the Time-Space Administration Bureau, and Admiral Lindy Harlaown's son.

 
 
 Lindy, the kind-spirited captain of the spaceship , works for the Time-Space Administration Bureau. She enjoys drinking green tea with sugar (and sometimes cream) added, which is ironic given her appreciation of Japanese culture. She adopts Fate at some point after A's.

 
 
 Amy also works on the Arthra, and is a good friend to Chrono and Lindy. She is an officer cadet, often tasked with research and intelligence gathering, which are apparently her specialties.

 
 
 He is a Dimensional Navy officer aboard the Arthra, with violet hair.

Nanoha's Family
 
 
 Unlike in Triangle Heart, his role in Magical Girl Lyrical Nanoha is relatively minor. He is Nanoha's older brother, who is in the process of training Miyuki.

 
 
 Miyuki, like her brother, is also a lead character of Triangle Hearts and is similarly proficient with swords. Though appearing a small number of times, it is evident that everything save her age and profession has been left unchanged from Triangle Heart.

 
 
 Nanoha's father. He may have the magical aptitude like his youngest daughter. He owns and works at the  cafe but also coaches a kid's soccer team. He used to be a bodyguard.

 
 
 Nanoha's mother. She works at the Midoriya cafe with her husband.

Others
 
 
 She is the first main villain of the Magical Girl Lyrical Nanoha series; a mage and the main resident of a gloomy hideout. Named after the Nissan Presea.

 
 
 In all of Fate's memories of the past, before her mother went insane, her name was Alicia. Alicia is Precia's biological daughter. They lived a happy life until Alicia died at the age of five, driving her mother insane.

 
 
 Alisa is an outspoken, dog-loving Anglophone and multimillionaire heiress, who gets angry when people keep secrets from her. Like Suzuka, she is a friend of Nanoha Takamachi and (in A's) Fate Testarossa.

 
 
 Suzuka is a character in the Magical Girl Lyrical Nanoha series that lives in a mansion with a lot of cats and is best friends with Nanoha Takamachi, Alisa Bannings, and in Magical Girl Lyrical Nanoha A's, Fate Testarossa.

 
 
 Shinobu is Suzuka's older sister and appears to be in the early stages of a relationship with Kyōya, which he appears to be unwilling to admit.
 
 
 Noel is the head maid of the Tsukimura household. Nanoha looks up to her as a cool, older sister figure. Noel appears to be human rather than mechanical (Triangle Heart's Noel), as she has a younger sister named Farin, who is Suzuka's personal maid.

 
 
 Also called Farin. She is Noel's younger sister and Suzuka's personal maid. She is seemingly fairly clumsy, almost dropping a plate full of cookies and tea when Yuuno and a kitten run underfoot.

Magical Girl Lyrical Nanoha A's
In A's, most of the characters from the prequel remain, with the addition of several others, mainly Hayate Yagami.

Wolkenritter (Cloud-knights)
 
 
 Her armed device is Lævatein (voiced by Tetsuya Kakihara in German).
 Signum has a long pink ponytail and appears to be the oldest of the group; she is also called Sword Knight. Her name is derived from the Opel Signum.

 
 
 Shamal, being Yūno's counterpart, does not actually fight, but uses her ring devices to defend, create portals, absorb victims' Linker Cores into the Book of Darkness, and the like. Her name is derived from the Maserati Shamal.

 
 
 Her armed device is Graf Eisen (voiced by Tetsuya Kakihara in German).
 A hot-tempered young redhead with a complex about her rabbit hat and armour, as they were given by Hayate. She is known as the Hammer Knight. Her name is derived from the Opel Vita.

 
 
 The Wolkenritter's (Cloud-knights) familiar-like companion, a large blue wolf, named after the Opel Zafira.

Time-Space Administration Bureau
 
 Voiced by: Naoko Suzuki (Anime), Sayaka Ohara (Movie)
 An Admiral of the Administration Bureau's Resources Management Department.

 
 
 Graham is an aging Englishman and one of the few people from Earth with a magical aptitude.
  and 
 Voiced by: Alia - Asuka Tanii (Japanese); Lotte - Miyu Matsuki (Japanese)

 
 
 Head of the precision engineering section of the TSAB Main Branch Engineering Division, she is responsible for working on Nanoha and Fate's devices. She is named for the Mazda Atenza.

Others
 
 
She works at Uminari University Hospital and is in charge of neurology. She is a skilled doctor, both kind and strict as a person, and is in charge of Hayate. She is very concerned for her well-being.

 
 

Magical Girl Lyrical Nanoha Reflection/Detonation

Planet Eltria Residents
 
 
Her and her family's surname is derived from the Isuzu Florian.
 
 

 
 He and Elenoa, his childhood friend and wife, continuously research on how to save their dying planet. However, he has been suffering from illness for a few years and hence his life is in danger by the time of the story.
 
 
 She and Granz, her childhood friend and husband, continuously research on how to save their dying planet.

Materials
 
 

 
 

 
 

Other characters

Magical Girl Lyrical Nanoha StrikerS

Mobile Section 6/Riot Force 6

Forward Unit
Nanoha, Fate, Vita and Signum serve as part of the Forward Unit of Mobile Section 6 (callsigns Stars 1, Lightning 1, Stars 2, and Lightning 2 respectively) but are not listed to prevent repeat entries.
 
 
 This young girl is a B-Ranked Mage who uses the Modern Belka magic system and a member of the Forward Stars, a squad led by Nanoha and Vita. Her call sign is Stars 3. Her outward appearance is that of a cheerful girl with boyish shortcut hair.

 
 
 Teana is a B-Ranked user of Mid-Childa magic, and a member of the Forward Stars. Her call sign is Stars 4. Teana met Subaru 3 years prior to the events of the series when the two were cadets, and the two have been teamed-up together ever since. Named after the Nissan Teana.

 
 
 His armed device is Strada (voiced by Tetsuya Kakihara) in German and English.
 The "Guard Wing" of the Lighting forwards, Erio is a Modern Belka Knight and a B-Ranked Mage. His call sign is Lightning 3. Erio was a young boy who taken in by Fate when he was younger, though he was officially adopted by Lindy Harlaown and was raised at the TSAB protection facility until he was eight. Among the newcomers, Erio is the fastest. His surname is derived from the Ferrari Mondial.

 
 
 Fate T. Harlaown became her guardian after sad circumstances left Caro with no place to live, and Caro comes to see her as an older sister but while in the Mobile Six her view of Fate changed into being a mother. Wherever she goes, Caro is usually accompanied by her pet dragon, Friedrich (or Fried, for short). Her name is a combination of the Mazda Carol and the Mazda Luce.

 
 Friedrich is Caro's dragon companion, whom she has had since he was hatched. Though Caro is a Dragon Summoner, Fried (as he is called) is not actually a summoned being but a real dragon. Caro is able to summon a larger body for Fried with the "Dragon Soul Summon" spell.
 
He was first mentioned by name in episode 10, and is said in the Striker S manga to be Caro's trump card.

Long Arch
Hayate is the commander of Mobile Section 6 and its administrative section called "Long Arch", but is not listed here to prevent repeat entries. The same applies to Shamal and Zafira, who are members of Long Arch.
 
 
 Hayate's Unison Device, born from fragments of the original Reinforce. She is often referred to by the nickname "Rein". Rein serves as Hayate's adviser, and is also sent out to the battlefield to provide assistance on occasion. In keeping with the German nature of the Wolkenritter, her full name is pronounced "Reinforce Zwei."

 
 
 Hayate's Second-in-Command in Long Arch as well as the son of TSAB Admiral Leti Lowran. He has known Nanoha, Fate and Hayate for some time and is childhood friends with fellow MS6 member Shario Finieno. He is allegedly named for the TVR Griffith.
 
 
 Communications operator in Long Arch and MS6's mechanic (specializing in devices).
 
 
 Sergeant Vice Granscenic serves as the Helicopter pilot of Mobile Section 6.

  and 
 Voiced by: Nozomi Masu (Alto) and Yukana (Lucino)
 Alto and Lucino are members of MS6's communications staff, serving as subordinates to Shario. They are named, respectively, for the Suzuki Alto and Nissan Lucino.

Battalion 108
 
 
 Subaru's father and a one time teacher of Hayate's, though Hayate has since passed Genya in rank. The Major is commander of the Ground Forces Unit 108, a ground-based unit for criminal investigation.

 
 
 Subaru's sister, who's 2 years older and 2 ranks ahead of her. Ginga was the one who taught Subaru her "Shooting Arts" magic.

 
 
 He is Ginga Nakajima's superior.

Capital City Defense Forces
 
 
 This Lieutenant General is the chief representative of the Capital City Defense Forces and a member of the TSAB Ground forces. Named after the Toyota HiAce Regius.
 
 
 Teana's older brother. Tiida, 11 years older than Teana, raised her after their parents' death in an accident. Her name is derived from the Nissan Tiida. 
 
 
 Regius' assistant, and as is revealed in Episode 24, his daughter. Her name is derived from the Toyota Auris.

Time Space Administration Bureau
 
 
 An inspector, a user of the Ancient Belka system and an old friend of Chrono's and Hayate's. Named after the Toyota Verossa.

Saint Church
 
 
 A Knight of the Saint Church and a member of the TSABs board of directors. Named after the Toyota Camry Gracia.
 
 
 A Nun of the Saint Church and Carim's personal assistant. Named after the Mitsuoka Nouera.

Scaglietti's organization
 
 
 A rogue scientist who's collecting Relics, powerful Lost Logia, for his ambitions. His surname is derived from the Ferrari 612 Scaglietti.

 
 
 A Belka Knights travelling with Lutecia and Agito. He is very mistrusting of Jail Scaglietti. His name is derived from the Honda Zest.

 
 
 A Belkan Bug Summoner. Lutecia travels with Zest and Agito. The 3 work with Scaglietti on getting Relics, but Lutecia is only of the 3 that trusts Scaglietti and his Numbers. Zest and Agito have tried to convince that Scaglietti isn't worth trusting, but have been unsuccessful as Lutecia views Scaglietti as a kind man. Her name is derived from the Renault Lutecia.

Zest's servants
These are people who are seen with Zest and assist him.
 
 
 Zest and Lutecia rescued an Ancient Belkan Unison Device without a master, Agito, from rogue scientists who were experimenting on her.

 Garyu
 One of Lutecia's many insect summons. Unlike the others his size is closest to a human. 
 Hakutenou
 A large humanoid-form insect. He first appears in episode 24 and is the equivalent to Caro's Voltaire.

Numbers
The  are Jail Scaglietti's personal task force, they are all "combat cyborgs" (戦闘機人 Sentoukijin).

 
 
 The oldest of the Numbers, has been Scaglietti's accomplice in many incidents. Her IS (Inherent Skill) allows her to obtain and process data without making use of conventional means, hence being undetectable. She also received mental implants to optimize her Intel management and general mental reflexes. In a battle her role is similar to that of an AWACS unit, taking charge of the communication between units and data gathering.
 
 
 The second member of the Numbers was designed while having in mind the need to produce a unit capable of performing long-term infiltration missions in an independent fashion.

 
 
 Although she is the third Number to be created, she is as old and experienced as Uno and Due. Her 'IS' are energy wings that forcefully accelerates her body's movements and that doubles as blades for mêlée combat.
 
 
 Quattro comes after Uno, Due, Tre and Cinque regarding the length of her period on active status.

 
 
 Although designated with the number '5', Cinque was first activated shortly before Quattro. Her 'IS' allows her to transfer energy into any metal that she touches and transform them into explosives. This ability is typically applied in her Stinger throwing knives. The Shell Coat that she wears is a defensive device with Barrier and AMF capabilities.

 
 
 An infiltration-type cyborg created at some point after Quattro.

 
 
 Along with Otto and Deed, Sette was one of the last Numbers to be completed.

 
 
 One of the last Numbers to be completed, along with Deed and Sette.

 
 
 Still a fairly recently born Number by the time of StrikerS, Nove is an offensive-type fighter with a combat style that focuses in high-speed movement and kicking attacks.

 
 
 Designated with the number "10", Dieci entered in service roughly at the same time as Sein and thus treats the Numbers 1 to 6 as her seniors.

 
 
 A hyperactive and mischievous girl, Wendi holds a position similar that of a guard wing in the Numbers formation due to the wide range of mobility granted by her Inherent Equipment and her superior marksmanship, which she is particularly proud of.

 
 
 Along with Otto and Sette, this dual sword wielder was one of the last Numbers to be completed. She and Otto were created while using the same genetic material as a basis.

Other characters
 
 
 The little sister of Vice Granscenic. She's named for the Renault Laguna. She and her brother's surname is derived from the Renault Grand Scénic.

 
 
 The late mother of Ginga and Subaru Nakajima. She once worked with Zest Grangaitz and Megane Alpine investigating an incident involving Combat Cyborgs, but was killed in the incident. Her name is derived from the Honda Quint.

 
 
 The mother of Lutecia Alpine. She once worked with Zest Grangaitz and Quint Nakajima investigating an incident involving Combat Cyborgs. Her first name is derived from the Renault Megane and her surname references Automobiles Alpine.

 
 
 A contemporary of the Sankt Kaiser, who has been in stasis since that era. She is discovered and rescued by Subaru during the Sound Stage X radio drama.

Magical Girl Lyrical Nanoha ViVid/Vivid Strike!
 
 
 A classmate and friend of Vivio's.

 
 
 Another classmate of Vivio's. Her device is named Bruzell and her ability is Creation.

 
 Was the last Sankt Kaiser to use the Saint's Cradle.

 
 Was the Hegemon of Shutra during the Ancient Belkan Era.

 
 
A classmate and friend of Einhart at the middle school campus of St. Hilde Academy of Magic.

Magical Record Lyrical Nanoha Force

Supporting characters
 
 
 Originally from Midchilda, Isis was working as a tailor in a city on Ruwella when she encountered Thoma and Lily. Named after the Toyota Isis.

Huckebein Family
A group of Eclipse Driver are tasked to after the Vandein Corporation's henchman called Faked Huckebein.

Veyron is a member of the Huckebein family and the owner of the EC Divider, code 928. Named after the Bugatti Veyron.

Cypha is another member of the Huckebein family and the owner of the EC Divider, code 944. Named after the WiLL Cypha.

Fortis is another member of the Huckebein family. Named after the Mitsubishi Galant Fortis.

DeVille is another member of the Huckebein family and the owner of the EC Divider, code 695. Named after the Cadillac DeVille.

Arnage is the another member of the Huckebein family and the owner of the EC Divider, code 718. Named after the Bentley Arnage.

Curren Huckebein is the leader of Huckebein family and the owner of the Book of Silver Cross. Named after the Toyota Curren.

Stella Irvine is the another member of Huckebein family and the owner of the Esquad Huckebein. Named after the Subaru Stella.

Sonica Lilian is the another member of Huckebein family who is a fortune teller. Named after the Daihatsu Sonica.

Rosalia is a humanoid Reactor just like Lily.

Grendel Gang

Kurt Grendel is the leader of Grendel Gang.

Mariya Ranevskaya is the sniper of Grendel Gang.

Lolo Endive is the courier of Grendel Gang.

Quinn Garland is the sword woman of Grendel Gang and the owner of the EC Divider, code VG4.

References

Attribution

External links

Anime and manga articles that need to differentiate between fact and fiction
Lists of anime and manga characters
Characters
Magical girl anime and manga characters